The River Eden is a river that flows through the Eden District of Cumbria, England, on its way to the Solway Firth.

Etymology
The river was known to the Romans as the Itouna, as recorded by the Greek geographer Claudius Ptolemaeus (Ptolemy) in the 2nd century AD. This name derives from the Celtic word ituna, meaning water, or rushing. Thus there is no relation to the biblical Garden of Eden.

Course of river
The Eden rises in Black Fell Moss, Mallerstang, on the high ground between High Seat, Yorkshire Dales and Hugh Seat. Here it forms the boundary between the counties of Cumbria and North Yorkshire. Two other rivers arise in the same peat bogs here, within a kilometre of each other: the River Swale and River Ure.

It starts life as Red Gill Beck, then becomes Hell Gill Beck, before turning north and joining with Ais Gill Beck to become the River Eden. (Hell Gill Force, just before it meets Ais Gill Beck, is the highest waterfall along its journey to the sea).

The steep-sided dale of Mallerstang later opens out to become the Vale of Eden. The river flows through Kirkby Stephen and Appleby-in-Westmorland, and receives the water of many becks flowing off the Pennines to the east, and longer rivers from the Lake District off to the west, including the River Lyvennet, River Leith and River Eamont, which arrives via Ullswater and Penrith.

Continuing north, it formed the eastern boundary of Inglewood Forest. It passes close to the ancient stone circle known as Long Meg and Her Daughters and through the sparsely populated beef and dairy farming regions of the vale of Cumbria on the Solway Plain. After flowing through Wetheral, where it is crossed by Corby Bridge, a  Grade I listed railway viaduct of 1834, it merges with the River Irthing from the east, followed by the River Petteril and River Caldew from the south, as it winds through Carlisle.

Its junction with the River Caldew in north Carlisle marks the point where Hadrian's Wall crosses the Eden, only five miles before both reach their end at the tidal flats.

Ecology
The river supports Atlantic salmon (Salmo salar) and Eurasian otter (Lutra lutra).  The river and its tributaries are designated a Special Area of Conservation under the European Union's Habitats Directive. The area protected by the SAC includes Ullswater.

See also

 List of Sites of Special Scientific Interest in Cumbria
The Stream Invites Us to Follow by Dick Capel published by Saraband

References

Bibliography

External links

 Eden Rivers Trust
 River Eden webcam at Appleby in Westmorland

Rivers of Cumbria
 
Special Areas of Conservation in Cumbria
Inglewood Forest